Carta de Amor (English: Love Letter) is a salsa song by Dominican singer-songwriter Juan Luis Guerra released in 1990 and served as the lead single from his sixth studio album Bachata Rosa (1990). Track talks about how he writes a letter to his lover in his journal, punctuation marks included. It is the second song of the album along with Como Abeja Al Panal to have salsa approach on the album. It was peaked as a highlight track of the album by Allmusic. It peaked at number 35 on Hot Latin Songs and was included in Guerra's greatest hits album Grandes Éxitos Juan Luis Guerra y 440 (1995).

Charts

References 

1991 singles
1991 songs
Juan Luis Guerra songs
Songs written by Juan Luis Guerra